N-Fluoropyridinium triflate is an organofluorine compound with the formula [C5H5NF]O3SCF3. It is a white solid with low solubility in polar organic solvents.  The compound is used as an electrophilic fluorinating agent.  It is a salt, consisting of the N-fluoropyridinium cation ([C5H5NF]+) and the triflate anion.  Related reagents include Selectfluor, which is also an N-fluorinated salt.

N-Fluoropyridinium cations are not only electrophilic fluorinating agents (i.e., sources of "F+"), they are also one-electron oxidants.

References

Reagents for organic chemistry
Triflates
Fluorinating agents
Pyridinium compounds